Tanzania Mbolea and Petrochemical Company (TMPC), a Tanzanian company that was specifically formed to design, build and operate a fertilizer-manufacturing factory in the Mtwara Region of Tanzania, using natural gas as raw material.

When completed, the plant will be the largest fertilizer-manufacturing factory in Africa, with capacity of 3.8 million metric tonnes of product annually.

Location

Overview
Tanzania Mbolea and Petrochemical Company, is a special purpose vehicle company (SPVC), established in 2016, to specifically design, build and operate the "Mtwara Fertilizer  Factory". The consortium in TMPC includes 1. The Tanzania Petroleum Development Corporation (TPDC) 2. Ferrostaal Industrial Projects of Germany 3. Haldor Topsoe AS of Denmark and 4. Fauji Fertiliser Company Limited of Pakistan. This SPV will own 20 percent of the factory. Other potential  investors in the factory include National Social Security Fund of Tanzania and Minjingu Mines.

The factory is valued at $3 billion, as of August 2017. The factory is expected to employ a total of 5,000 people, during construction and manufacturing operations. Construction began in 2016, with commissioning expected in 2020. In 2021, the company began building a petrochemical complex in Lindi, Tanzania.

Ownership
Tanzania Mbolea and Petrochemical Company is owned by the following  corporate entities as outlined in the table below:

See also
 Mtwara Thermal Power Station
 Tanzania Liquefied Natural Gas Project
 Mtwara–Dar es Salaam Natural Gas Pipeline

References

External links
 Tanzania prepares to construct mega fertilizer plant in Mtwara
 Tanzania to build fertiliser factory As of 21 April 2018.

Chemical companies established in 2016
2016 establishments in Tanzania
Mtwara Region
Fertilizer companies of Tanzania